"Dizz Knee Land" is the debut single by Los Angeles-based alternative rock group dada. It was the first single taken from their debut album titled, Puzzle.  "Dizz Knee Land" proved to be very successful for the band upon its release in 1992, reaching number 5 on the Billboard Modern Rock chart, and number 27 on the Billboard Mainstream Rock chart.

Meaning 
This is what bassist Joie Calio had to say on the Westwood One radio program On the Edge:

The song isn't about Disneyland at all. It's not about Disneyland. It... has nothing to do with Disneyland, actually. It has more to do with the craziness of the juxtaposition of the state of your every day. Just looking around you. You could see a guy's head being chopped off and, you know, a leg flying away and someone embracing someone in a lovely kiss and then flip the channel and then a chainsaw goes buzzing through, you know, some butter and it accidentally cuts your mom's head off and then you flip again and they're making love and then you flip again and it's Montana going 'I'm going to Disneyland'. You know, it's just that whole thing, how insane it is, but you know, it's just the natural state. I don't think we're making a, we're not pointing our fingers. We're just... it just is, and we're just singin' it.

Joie said this about the song in a Chicago Sun-Times interview: "It's our best-known song, but it's not our best song. I got the idea for the song in a dream where I saw this word "Disneyland" on a bus. I heard the melody and then I woke up, wrote it all down and called Mike up to finish it up."

Music video
The music video for the song mostly features the band playing on an empty stage.  During the video, there are several shots of several random objects moving.  Some of these objects include leaves, hard candy, nuts and bolts, rusty tools and a flatiron.  This stop motion technique has been used before in the music video for Peter Gabriel's "Sledgehammer".

References

1992 singles
Dada (band) songs
Song recordings produced by Ken Scott
1992 songs
I.R.S. Records singles